This is a list of television serial dramas released by TVB in 2022, including highest-rated television dramas and award ceremonies.

Top ten drama series in ratings
The following is a list of TVB's top serial dramas in 2022 by viewership ratings. The recorded ratings include premiere week, final week, finale episode, and the average overall count of live Hong Kong viewers (in millions).

Awards

First line-up
These dramas air in Hong Kong every Monday to Sunday from 8:00 pm to 8:30 pm on Jade.

Second line-up
These dramas air in Hong Kong from 8:30 pm to 9:30 pm, Monday to Friday on Jade.

Third line-up
These dramas air in Hong Kong from 9:30 pm to 10:30 pm, Monday to Friday on Jade

Weekend dramas
Starting on 1 May 2022 until 29 May 2022, these dramas air in Hong Kong from 10:00pm to 11:00pm, Sunday on Jade.

Notes
Story Of Zom-B 食腦喪Ｂ; Copyright notice: 2021.
Stranger Anniversary 雙生陌生人; Copyright notice: 2022.

References

External links

   

2022
2020s in Hong Kong television